Francesco Gaeta (1879 – 15 April 1927) was an Italian poet.

His early works were initially influenced by Gabriele D'Annunzio, and were characterized by a sentimental and sensual mood. His language featured both refined and popular elements.

He committed suicide, aged 47.

Selected works
 Il libro della giovinezza (1895)
 Sonetti voluttuosi e altre poesie (1906)
 Salvatore Di Giacomo (1911, essay)
 Poesie d'amore (1920)

1879 births
1927 suicides
Italian poets
Italian male poets
Suicides in Italy